Douglas Ross Belsher (19 January 1933 – 12 December 2003) was a Canadian politician and businessman who served as a member of the House of Commons of Canada. His career included managing Eaton's stores at various British Columbia locations.

Early life 
Belsher was born in Kincaid, Saskatchewan, and raised on his family's farm in McCord. He graduated from Luther College and earned a diploma from the University of Saskatchewan College of Agriculture.

Career 
Belsher represented the British Columbia riding of Fraser Valley East where he was first elected in the 1984 federal election and re-elected in 1988, becoming a member in the 33rd and 34th Canadian Parliaments. During his tenure, he also served as parliamentary secretary to the minister of fisheries and oceans.

Belsher left federal politics in the 1993 federal election when he was defeated by Chuck Strahl of the Reform Party of Canada.

Personal life 
Belsher died of cancer at the Abbotsford Regional Hospital and Cancer Centre in 2003. He was a member of the Alliance World Fellowship, an evangelical denomination.

References

1933 births
2003 deaths
Members of the House of Commons of Canada from British Columbia
Progressive Conservative Party of Canada MPs
Deaths from cancer in British Columbia

University of Saskatchewan alumni
Luther College (Saskatchewan) alumni